Gary Walter Jarrett (born September 3, 1942) is a Canadian former professional ice hockey forward. He played for the Toronto Maple Leafs, Detroit Red Wings, and Oakland Seals/California Golden Seals between 1960 and 1972, and then spent four seasons in the WHA with the Cleveland Crusaders before retiring after the 1976 season.

Career statistics

Regular season and playoffs

External links

1942 births
Living people
California Golden Seals players
Canadian ice hockey forwards
Cleveland Crusaders players
Denver Invaders players
Detroit Red Wings players
Oakland Seals players
Pittsburgh Hornets players
Rochester Americans players
Ice hockey people from Toronto
Sudbury Wolves (EPHL) players
Toronto Marlboros players
Toronto Maple Leafs players
Tulsa Oilers (1964–1984) players